The MS Etzel is a preserved motor ship on Lake Zürich in Switzerland. She was built for the Zürichsee-Schifffahrtsgesellschaft (Lake Zurich Navigation Company) in 1934, and operated for them until she was retired in 2001. She is now owned and operated by the Etzel society, a society specifically created to preserve her.

The Etzel is named after the Etzel, a mountain overlooking Lake Zurich.

The Etzel is available for charter. The society which owns the ship also organises occasional excursions aboard the vessel.

References

External links 

1934 ships
Ships of Switzerland
Ships built in Switzerland